Zoom! The Best of 1995–2016 is a compilation album by the Welsh alternative rock band Super Furry Animals, released on 4 November 2016. It is the band's third compilation album, after the B-sides/rarities collection Out Spaced (1998), and Songbook: The Singles, Vol. 1 (2004).

Background
The release collects all of the band's singles as well as some 'deep cuts' from their studio albums. "Organ Yn Dy Geg" is originally from the Llanfairpwllgwyngyllgogerychwyndrobwllantysiliogogogochynygofod (in space) E.P.. "The Citizen's Band" was originally a hidden track found in the pregap of Guerrilla. Presented as an individually advertised track for the first time, it had not been released with copies of Guerrilla via digital methods. "Patience" was originally on the DVD version of Rings Around the World and was only previously released on CD on the bonus disc for the U.S. release of Rings Around the World.

The title of the album is named after "Zoom!", the opening track from the band's 2005 album Love Kraft. It appears in a previously unreleased edit on this compilation in which the sample of guitarist Huw Bunford jumping into a swimming pool at the start of the track is removed.

Packaging
The album's artwork was designed by longtime collaborator Pete Fowler and the sleeve notes were written by noted Welsh music journalist and author Simon Price.

Track listing

References

Super Furry Animals albums
2016 compilation albums
BMG Rights Management albums
Albums with cover art by Pete Fowler